MSC Beatrice is one of the largest container ships in the world. Because of her size the deckhouse was moved forward. This solution increases container capacity as well as improves torsional strength

She is the second of eight  vessels ordered from Samsung Heavy Industries, with another four class vessels ordered from Daewoo Shipbuilding & Marine Engineering (DSME), a company spun-off from Daewoo in 2000.

Despite her larger claimed capacity, MSC Beatrice is neither the longest container ship in the world, nor does it have the largest tonnage. Maersk Mc-Kinney Møller is the first of a class of 20 identical Triple E vessels.

References

Container ships
Ships built by Samsung Heavy Industries
2009 ships